Sir Charles George Latham (26 January 1882 – 26 August 1968), often shortened to simply C. G. Latham, was an Australian politician, former leader of the opposition in Western Australia and the 10th President of the Western Australian Legislative Council. Latham served over twelve years as leader of the state's Country Party, and over thirty years in the Parliament of Western Australia. Latham also served roughly ten months in the Federal Parliament, as a Senator for Western Australia.

Biography
Latham was born in Hythe, Kent in England, and became an orphan before the age of 8 when his parents Thomas Latham (a coast guard) and Isabella (née Isum) died. Latham moved to New South Wales in Australia with his siblings in 1890 and married Marie Louisa von Allwörden on 24 June 1903 at Hay in the same state.

In his early farming days, he was unsuccessful, but was not deterred by the 1914 drought and owned  of land in 1921 when he entered parliament.

In 1916 Latham enlisted in the entirely volunteer-run First Australian Imperial Force and was promoted to the rank of Corporal in January 1917. He was wounded in France in March 1918. Latham was promoted Sergeant in 1919 and was discharged in May of that year.

Political career
Latham became the Country Party (now National Party) candidate for the Legislative Assembly seat of York in 1921 and became a MLA following this endorsement. Before the First World War Latham was a member of the Bruce Rock Road Board before the war, but upon his return to Australia he became the chairman of the Narembeen Road Board in 1924. In 1930 Latham became the parliamentary leader of the Country Party and fervently rallied for farmers' rights. Later that year he joined the Party with the Nationalist Party and served as deputy Premier of Western Australia under James Mitchell from 1930 to 1933. From 1933 onwards, Latham was the Leader of the Opposition until 1942, when he resigned to fill a vacancy in the Australian Senate but lost the 1943 election. Latham then returned to Parliament in 1946 to serve as a Member of the Legislative Council, became Minister for Agriculture in 1952–53 and retired in 1960, after another two years as the President of the Legislative Council.

Latham died on 26 August 1968 and was cremated at Karrakatta Cemetery.

See also
Leader of the Opposition (Western Australia)
National Party of Western Australia

References
Notes

Citations

1882 births
1968 deaths
Deputy Premiers of Western Australia
Members of the Western Australian Legislative Assembly
Members of the Western Australian Legislative Council
National Party of Australia members of the Parliament of Western Australia
Members of the Australian Senate
Members of the Australian Senate for Western Australia
Presidents of the Western Australian Legislative Council
Australian Knights Bachelor
People from Hythe, Kent
English emigrants to Australia
Leaders of the Opposition in Western Australia
National Party of Australia members of the Parliament of Australia
20th-century Australian politicians